The 2007–08 Swiss Challenge League was the fifth season of the Swiss Challenge League, the second tier of the Swiss football league pyramid. It began on 20 July 2007 and ended on 12 May 2008. The champions of this season, FC Vaduz, earned promotion to the 2008–09 Super League. The runners-up AC Bellinzona won the promotion/relegation playoff against the 9th-placed team of the 2007–08 Super League, FC St. Gallen. The bottom four teams, SC Kriens, SR Delémont, FC Chiasso and SC Cham, were relegated to the 1. Liga.

Teams

League table

Top goal scorers
Only players with at least 10 goals

External links
 Swiss League Competitions

Swiss Challenge League seasons
2007–08 in Swiss football
Swiss